Praseodymium compounds are compounds formed by the lanthanide metal praseodymium (Pr). In these compounds, praseodymium generally exhibits the +3 oxidation state, such as PrCl3, Pr(NO3)3 and Pr(CH3COO)3. However, compounds with praseodymium in the +2 and +4 oxidation states, and unlike other lanthanides, the +5 oxidation state, are also known.

Oxides 

Praseodymium can form oxides in many different ways, although the only oxides that are stable at room temperature are Pr2O3, Pr6O11 and PrO2. Praseodymium(III) oxide is a green powder that forms hexagonal crystals, and crystallizes in the manganese(III) oxide or bixbyite structure. Praseodymium(IV) oxide can be produced by boiling Pr6O11 in water or acetic acid:

 Pr6O11 + 3 H2O → 4 PrO2 + 2 Pr(OH)3

Praseodymium(III,IV) oxide is the most stable form of the praseodymium oxides at ambient temperature and pressure. It is soluble in water and has a cubic fluorite structure. It can be prepared via solid-state methods such as thermolysis, molten salt method, calcination or precipitation.

In addition to Pr6O11, praseodymium also forms a system of oxides at different phases:

Halides 

Praseodymium metal reacts with all the stable halogens to form green trihalides:
2 Pr (s) + 3 F2 (g) → 2 PrF3 (s) 
2 Pr (s) + 3 Cl2 (g) → 2 PrCl3 (s) 
2 Pr (s) + 3 Br2 (g) → 2 PrBr3 (s) 
2 Pr (s) + 3 I2 (g) → 2 PrI3 (s) 

Praseodymium(III) fluoride is the most stable fluoride of praseodymium. It can be prepared the reaction between praseodymium(III) nitrate and sodium fluoride will produce praseodymium(III) fluoride as a green crystalline solid. Praseodymium(III) chloride is a light green solid that can be prepared by treating praseodymium metal with hydrogen chloride. It is usually purified by vacuum sublimation. It is Lewis acidic, classified as "hard" according to the HSAB concept. Rapid heating of the hydrate may cause small amounts of hydrolysis. PrCl3 forms a stable Lewis acid-base complex K2PrCl5 by reaction with potassium chloride; this compound shows interesting optical and magnetic properties.

Praseodymium(III) bromide is the only stable bromide of praseodymium. It adopts the  crystal structure. The praseodymium ions are 9-coordinate and adopt a tricapped trigonal prismatic geometry. The praseodymium–bromine bond lengths are 3.05 Å and 3.13 Å. Praseodymium(III) iodide can be prepared by heating praseodymium and iodine in an inert atmosphere produces praseodymium(III) iodide, or by heating praseodymium with mercury(II) iodide. It forms orthorhombic crystals which are hygroscopic. It crystallizes in the PuBr3 type with space group Cmcm (No. 63) with a = 4.3281(6) Å, b = 14.003(6) Å and c = 9.988(3) Å.

The tetrafluoride, PrF4, is also known, and is produced by reacting a mixture of sodium fluoride and praseodymium(III) fluoride with fluorine gas, producing Na2PrF6, following which sodium fluoride is removed from the reaction mixture with liquid hydrogen fluoride. Additionally, praseodymium forms a bronze diiodide; like the diiodides of lanthanum, cerium, and gadolinium, it is a praseodymium(III) electride compound.

Organopraseodymium compounds 

Organopraseodymium compounds are compounds with a praseodymium-to-carbon bond. These compounds are very similar to those of the other lanthanides, as they all share an inability to undergo π backbonding. They are thus mostly restricted to the mostly ionic cyclopentadienides (isostructural with those of lanthanum) and the σ-bonded simple alkyls and aryls, some of which may be polymeric. The coordination chemistry of praseodymium is largely that of the large, electropositive Pr3+ ion, and is thus largely similar to those of the other early lanthanides La3+, Ce3+, and Nd3+. For instance, like lanthanum, cerium, and neodymium, praseodymium nitrate forms both the 4:3 and 1:1 complexes with 18-crown-6, whereas the middle lanthanides from promethium to gadolinium can only form the 4:3 complex and the later lanthanides from terbium to lutetium cannot successfully coordinate to all the ligands. Such praseodymium complexes have high but uncertain coordination numbers and poorly defined stereochemistry, with exceptions resulting from exceptionally bulky ligands such as the tricoordinate [Pr{N(SiMe3)2}3]. There are also a few mixed oxides and fluorides involving praseodymium(IV), but it does not have an appreciable coordination chemistry in this oxidation state like its neighbour cerium. However, the first example of a molecular complex of praseodymium(IV) has recently been reported. Like the other organolanthanide compounds, properties of organopraseodymium compounds include:
Organopraseodymium compounds are very air- and water-sensitive and pyrophoric.
Chemistry in the 0 oxidation state is far more limited.  In fact, their electropositive nature makes their organometallic compounds more likely to be ionic.
Organopraseodymium compounds form no stable carbonyls at room temperature; organopraseodymium carbonyl compounds have been observed only in argon matrices, and decompose when heated to 40 K.

σ-Bonded complexes 

Metal-carbon σ bonds are found in alkyls of praeodymium such as [PrMe6]3− and Pr[CH(SiMe3)2]3.

π-Bonded complexes 

Cyclopentadienyl complexes, are known for praseodymium. It can be produced by the following reaction scheme: 
3 Na[Cp] + PrCl3  → Pr[Cp]3 + 3 NaCl
These compounds are of limited use and academic interest.

Applications 

Praseodymium(III) nitride is used in high-end electric and semiconductor products, and as a raw material to produce phosphor. Also it is used as a magnetic material and sputtering target material. Many praseodymium compounds, such as praseodymium(III) oxalate, are used to colour some glasses and enamels. If mixed with certain other materials, praseodymium(III) oxalate paints glass intense yellow.

Praseodymium(III,IV) oxide has a number of potential applications in chemical catalysis, and is often used in conjunction with a promoter such as sodium or gold to improve its catalytic performance. It has a high-K dielectric constant of around 30 and very low leakage currents which have also made it a promising material for many potential applications in nanodevices and microelectronics.

References

See also 
 Neodymium compounds
 Europium compounds

Chemical compounds by element